Esteban Echeverría Partido is a partido in the Gran Buenos Aires urban area, in Buenos Aires Province in Argentina.

The partido is named after the poet and novelist Esteban Echeverría.

Districts
 Monte Grande
 9 de Abril
 Canning
 El Jagüel
 Luis Guillón

References

External links
 provincial site
  municipal site
 Everything about Monte Grande

 
1913 establishments in Argentina
Partidos of Buenos Aires Province
Populated places established in 1913